Pereña de la Ribera is a Spanish municipality in the autonomous community of Castile and León.

References

Municipalities in the Province of Salamanca